The 1982 Texas gubernatorial election was held on November 2, 1982, to elect the governor of Texas. Incumbent Republican Governor Bill Clements ran for reelection, but was defeated in the general election by Democrat Mark White, winning 46% of the vote to White's 53%. White was sworn into office on January 18, 1983.

White carried 196 out of 254 counties. As of 2023, this is the last time a Democrat won a majority of the vote in a Texas gubernatorial election.

Primaries

Republican

Candidates 

 Bill Clements, Incumbent
 Duke Embs

|}

Democratic

Candidates 

 Mark White, Attorney General
 Buddy Temple, Railroad Commissioner
 Bob Armstrong, Former Land Commissioner
 David Young
 Ray Allen Mayo II
 Donald R. Beagle

|}

Temple refused to participate in the runoff, causing White to win by default.

Results

|}

Videos
(1) Gubernatorial Debate from September 24, 1982 in Amarillo 

(2) White Campaign commercials from October 7, 1982 

(3) White Campaign commercials from October 28, 1982 

(4) White Campaign commercial from September 29, 1982 

(5) White Campaign commercial for the Democratic Primary on April 12, 1982 

(6) White Campaign commercial for the Democratic Primary on March 6, 1982 

(7) Revised commercial from March 6, 1982 

(8) White Campaign commercial for the Democratic Primary on March 23, 1982 

(9) Gubernatorial Debate from October 11, 1982 in Austin

References

1982
Texas
Gubernatorial